Line 6 of the Fuzhou Metro runs from Cangshan District to Changle District. Line 6's color is blue. Phase 1 of the line opened on 28 August 2022.

Sections

Phase 1
Phase 1 of Line 6 starts at Pandun station and ends at Wanshou station. The total length is 31.346 km. There are 16 stations in the section, including 1 elevated station and 15 underground stations. Construction began at the end of 2016. Phase 1 of the line opened on 28 August 2022.

Phase 2
Phase 2 extension to Shibakongzha station is under construction.

Stations

See also
 Fuzhou Metro

References

External links
 Fuzhou Metro – official website 

06